"It's for You" is a song by Japanese pop rock band U-ka Saegusa in dB. It was released on 28 August 2002 through Giza Studio, as the second single from their first extended play Secret & Lies. The single reached number twenty in Japan and has sold over 14,610 copies nationwide. The song served as the theme songs to the Japanese anime television series, Cheeky Angel.

Track listing

Charts

Certification and sales

|-
! scope="row"| Japan (RIAJ)
| 
| 14,610
|-
|}

Release history

References

2002 singles
2002 songs
J-pop songs
Song recordings produced by Daiko Nagato
Songs written by Daria Kawashima